Eden Peak is located on the border of Alberta and British Columbia, east of Cummins Lakes Provincial Park and between the Chaba and Apex Glaciers. It was named in 1901 by Jean Habel.

See also
 List of peaks on the British Columbia–Alberta border
 List of mountains in the Canadian Rockies

References

Three-thousanders of Alberta
Three-thousanders of British Columbia
Canadian Rockies
Mountains of Jasper National Park